Desulfatitalea  is a bacteria genus from the family of Desulfosarcinaceae.

References

Further reading 
 

Desulfobacterales
Bacteria genera
Monotypic bacteria genera